Pachysylvia is a genus of bird in the family Vireonidae.

Species
It contains the following species:

References

External links

 
Vireonidae
Bird genera
Taxa named by Charles Lucien Bonaparte